Veronika Pavlovich (Belarusian: Вераніка Паўлавіч; born 8 May 1978) is a Belarusian table tennis player.

She competed at the 2008 Summer Olympics, reaching the third round of the singles competition. She competed in doubles in 2004.

Pavlovich was born in Minsk, and resides there. Her twin sister Viktoria Pavlovich is also an Olympic table tennis player.

References

1978 births
Living people
Belarusian female table tennis players
Table tennis players at the 2000 Summer Olympics
Table tennis players at the 2004 Summer Olympics
Table tennis players at the 2008 Summer Olympics
Olympic table tennis players of Belarus
Sportspeople from Minsk
Belarusian twins
Twin sportspeople
Universiade medalists in table tennis
Universiade bronze medalists for Belarus
Medalists at the 2001 Summer Universiade